Yannick Bach (born 21 May 1991) is a German footballer who plays as a midfielder for FC Hertha Wiesbach. He came through Saarbrücken's youth setup, and made his first-team debut in July 2011, when he replaced Kai Gehring in a 3. Fußball-Liga match against Chemnitzer FC.

References

External links 
 

1991 births
Living people
German footballers
Association football midfielders
3. Liga players
1. FC Saarbrücken players
Borussia Neunkirchen players